The halavi guitarfish (Glaucostegus halavi)  is a species of ray found in the Indo-West Pacific (Red Sea to Gulf of Oman, with unconfirmed records in the area east of Oman). Recorded twice, in 1997 and 2004, in the levantine waters, the question of its permanent settlement in the Mediterranean Sea remains open. Its name is derived from the Arabic word  (halawi).

It feeds on small molluscs and bony fishes.

References 

halavi guitarfish
Fish of the Red Sea
halavi guitarfish